The Loyd Carrier was one of a number of small tracked vehicles used by the British and Commonwealth forces in the Second World War to transport equipment and men about the battlefield. Alongside the Bren, Scout and Machine Gun Carriers, they also moved infantry support weapons.

Design and development
The Loyd Carrier was built upon the mechanicals (engine, gearbox and transmission) of a 15 cwt 4x2 Fordson 7V truck with mild steel bodywork to which armour plate - 'BP Plate' (from "Bullet Proof") -  was bolted (to the front and upper sides) depending on application. The engine was at the rear of the Carrier with the radiator behind rather than in front. The transmission then took the drive forward to the axle at the very front where it drove the tracks. Both the front drive sprockets and idlers (which were also sprocketed) at the rear of the tracks were fitted with brakes, actuated by a pair of levers by the driver. To turn the vehicle to the left, the brakes were applied on that side and the Carrier would slew round the stopped track.

The upper hull covered the front and sides but was open to the rear and above; as the Carrier was not expected to function as a fighting vehicle, this was not an issue. To protect the occupants from the weather, a canvas tilt could be put up; this was standard fitment from the factory.

As part of the rapid development program, the Loyd used parts from other vehicles: From the Universal Carrier, the track, drive sprockets, and Horstmann suspension units; from the Fordson 7V, the chassis, engine, gearbox, torque tube and front axle. The brake drums and back plates were designed specifically for the Loyd.

The Army tested the Loyd Carrier in 1939 and placed an initial order for 200 as the Carrier, Tracked, Personnel Carrying i.e. a personnel carrier. Initial deliveries were from Vivian Loyd's own company, but production moved to the larger firms, including the Ford Motor Company and Wolseley Motors (13,000 between them) and Dennis Brothers Ltd, Aveling & Barford and  Sentinel Waggon Works. Total production of the Loyd Carrier was approximately 26,000.

Service

Second World War
Early in the war, the TT along with the TPC variants were part of the standard equipment of Royal Engineer Chemical Warfare Companies. Most of the Chemical Warfare Companies were disbanded or repurposed in 1943 in order to free up their 4.2 inch mortars for desperately needed conventional use by infantry divisions in-theatre; the mortars and supporting equipment were attached to each division's machine-gun battalion in company strength.

By far the most notable use of the Loyd was in the TT (Tracked Towing) configuration, where it pulled the 6 pounder anti-tank gun from the Normandy landings of 1944 through to the end of the war. There are many wartime photographs of Loyds in action in Normandy, and a number were photographed destroyed in the well-known battle of Villers-Bocage in 1944.

The Loyd Carrier was also paired with Caterpillar D8 tractors in service with Royal Electrical and Mechanical Engineers for tank recovery - the Carrier carrying spare equipment for the tractor.

Post-war

Both Belgium and the Netherlands bought Loyd TTs from the British Army; they were still in Belgian Army ownership up to at least 1963 as engine rebuild plates have been seen with this date in original Belgian vehicles.

A Belgian variant was the CATI 90 (Canon antitank d'infanterie automoteur 90mm), a self-propelled gun in use from 1954 to 1962. The vehicle served in infantry units with a paired ammunition carrier.

Some vehicles were sold on into private ownership for farming use (a 1941 No1Mk1 TPC with a ploughing conversion still exists in Nottinghamshire, UK) and a number were placed as targets on Belgian ranges.

Variants
Loyd carriers were available in three "numbers", which were available in two "marks"; all manufactured during wartime, and varied in the type/sourcing of the Ford V8 sidevalve engine they were powered by:
 No. 1 - British Ford V8 engine (21 stud) and gearbox
 No. 2 - US Ford V8 engine (24 stud) and gearbox
 No. 3 - Ford Canada V8 engine (24 stud) and gearbox

The two marks were:
 Mark I - Bendix brake system
 Mark II - Girling brake system

Roles 
There were not many differences between variants, mainly seating and armour plate location:

Tracked Personnel Carrier (TPC)
Equipped with a front bench seat and seating for troops on the track guards. Frontal and full side armour fitted.

Tracked Towing (TT) - Initially known as 'Tractor Anti-tank, MkI'
Equipped with four single seats and ammunition stowage on the track guards. Used for towing the 4.2 inch mortar and hauling the QF 2 pounder and QF 6 pounder anti-tank guns and carrying its crew. Frontal and front quarter armour fitted. The main variant by number manufactured.

Tracked Cable Layer Mechanical (TCLM)
A vehicle for Royal Corps of Signals work. No armour fitted.

Tracked Starting and Charging (TS&C)
Equipped with a front bench seat, 30 volt and 12 volt DC generators driven from the gearbox layshaft and battery sets to support armoured regiment tanks. No armour fitted.

Notes

References

Further reading

External links

 Mapleafup.net
 Armyvehicles.dk

World War II armoured fighting vehicles of the United Kingdom
World War II armoured fighting vehicles of Canada
Tracked military vehicles
Military vehicles introduced in the 1930s
Armoured personnel carriers of WWII
Tracked armoured personnel carriers